Attorney General Foster may refer to:

Dwight Foster (politician, born 1828) (1828–1884), Attorney General of Massachusetts
Joseph Foster (politician) (born 1959), Attorney General of New Hampshire
William John Foster (1831–1909), Attorney General of New South Wales

See also
General Foster (disambiguation)